CHFT-FM is a Canadian radio station broadcasting at 100.5 FM in Fort McMurray, Alberta. The station airs a rock-leaning classic hits format branded on-air as 100.5 Cruz FM. The station is owned by Harvard Media.

Initially owned by Newcap Radio, the station received CRTC approval on November 15, 2006 and launched on June 16, 2008 branded as 100.5 K-Rock.

On December 10, 2009, the station applied to the CRTC to increase their effective radiated power from 25,000 watts to 50,000 watts and received approval on June 9, 2010.

On November 7, 2013, the CRTC approved the application by Harvard Broadcasting Inc to acquire CHFT from Newcap Radio.

On December 26, 2013, at 10 a.m, CHFT was rebranded to 100.5 Cruz FM. The last song on "K-Rock" was "The Boys of Summer" by Don Henley, while the first song on "Cruz" was "Rock of Ages" by Def Leppard.

References

External links
100.5 Cruz FM
 

HFT
HFT
HFT
Radio stations established in 2008
2008 establishments in Alberta